Ahmed Hassan (born 12 September 1941) is an Egyptian boxer. He competed in the men's middleweight event at the 1964 Summer Olympics.

References

External links
 

1941 births
Living people
Egyptian male boxers
Olympic boxers of Egypt
Boxers at the 1964 Summer Olympics
Place of birth missing (living people)
Middleweight boxers
20th-century Egyptian people